Kicking in the Water is the second album by Canadian band The Gandharvas. It was released in 1995 on the Watch Music record label. The album featured the singles "Drool" and "The Masochistic Minstrel", both of which have music videos.

Track listing 
"Drool" – 4:06
"The Masochistic Minstrel" – 4:15
"The Very Thing" – 4:43
"A Quick Feel" – 6:00
"Two at a Table Set for Three" – 4:07
"Landing" – 3:46
"Hollow You Out" – 3:25
"Held to the Ground" – 5:09
"Kicking in the Water" – 3:47
"i-i-i (a wave)" – 4:12
"Got You Alone" – 2:32

References

1995 albums
The Gandharvas albums